Erick Iskersky was the defending champion, but lost in the first round to Chip Hooper.

Nick Saviano won the title by defeating Hooper 6–4, 4–6, 6–3 in the final.

Seeds

Draw

Finals

Top half

Bottom half

References

External links
 Official results archive (ATP)
 Official results archive (ITF)

1983 Grand Prix (tennis)